Piermaria Jorge Oddone (born March 26, 1944 in Arequipa, Peru) is a Peruvian-American particle physicist.

Oddone earned his bachelor's degree in Physics at the Massachusetts Institute of Technology in 1965 and a PhD in Physics from Princeton University in 1970.

From 1972, Oddone worked at the US Department of Energy’s Lawrence Berkeley National Laboratory. In 1987 he was appointed Director of the Physics Division at Berkeley Lab, and later became the Laboratory Deputy Director for scientific programs.  In 1987, he proposed the idea of using an Asymmetric B-factory to study the violation of CP symmetry in the decay of B-mesons.

In the late seventies and early eighties, Dr. Oddone was a member of the team that developed the first Time Projection Chamber (TPC). This technology was subsequently used for many particle and nuclear physics experiments. He led the TPC collaboration from 1984 to 1987.

He was appointed director of Fermi National Accelerator Laboratory (Fermilab) and took up office on 1 July 2005.

Oddone received the 2005 Panofsky Prize in Experimental Particle Physics for the invention of the Asymmetric B-Factory to carry out precision measurements of CP violation in B-meson decays.

He was elected Fellow of the American Physical Society in 1990 "for significant research in elementary- particle physics and contributions to the development of apparatus as well as of the infrastructure required for future advances of the field" 

In September 2012, Oddone announced he would retire on July 1, 2013, after 8 years serving as lab director.

References

External links
 

1944 births
Living people
Particle physicists
Peruvian people of Italian descent
American people of Peruvian descent
21st-century American physicists
MIT Department of Physics alumni
Princeton University alumni
Winners of the Panofsky Prize
Peruvian physicists
People associated with Fermilab
Fellows of the American Physical Society